Oliver Helander (born 1 January 1997) is a Finnish track and field athlete who competes in the javelin throw. He has also played handball. He won the javelin throw Finnish championship in 2018.

He qualified to represent Finland at the 2020 Summer Olympics.

He is the older brother of handball player Benjamin Helander.

Competition record

Seasonal bests by year
2011 - 57.43 m
2014 - 69.04 m
2015 - 76.28 m
2016 - 71.67 m
2017 - 80.25 m
2018 - 88.02 m
2019 - 86.93 m
2021 - 86.13 m
2022 - 89.83 m

References

External links

1997 births
Living people
Finnish male javelin throwers
Athletes (track and field) at the 2020 Summer Olympics
Olympic athletes of Finland
20th-century Finnish people
21st-century Finnish people